A pre-flight safety briefing (also known as a pre-flight demonstration, in-flight safety briefing, in-flight safety demonstration, safety instructions, or simply the safety video) is a detailed explanation given before take-off to airline passengers about the safety features of the aircraft they are aboard.

Aviation regulations do not state how an airline should deliver the briefing, only that ‘The operator of an aircraft shall ensure that all passengers are orally briefed before each take-off’. As a result, and depending on the in-flight entertainment system in the aircraft, as well as the airline's policy, airlines may deliver a pre-recorded briefing or provide a live demonstration. A live demonstration is performed by one or more flight attendants standing up in the aisles, while another flight attendant narrates over the public address system. A pre-recorded briefing may feature audio only, or may take the form of a video (audio plus visual). Pre-flight safety briefings typically last two to six minutes. In consideration for travelers not speaking the airline's official language and for the passengers with hearing problems, the video may feature subtitles, an on-screen signer, or may be repeated in another language.

Some safety videos are made using three-dimensional graphics. Other videos were made to be humorous, or feature celebrities, or were based on popular movies. Many safety videos were uploaded to YouTube. The flight attendant featured in a Delta Air Lines video from 2008 has become an internet celebrity known as Deltalina. The current (as of 2021) British Airways safety video, featuring several comedians, actors and other celebrities such as Rowan Atkinson, Gordon Ramsay and Gillian Anderson, is of humorous character and seeks to raise funds for the Comic Relief charity.

In an emergency, flight attendants are trained to calmly instruct passengers how to respond, given the type of emergency.

Required elements
Airlines are required to orally brief their passengers before each take-off. This requirement is set by their nation's civil aviation authority, under the recommendation of the International Civil Aviation Organization. All airline safety videos are subtitled or shown secondarily in English as it is the lingua franca of aviation. Sometimes a video briefing is subtitled with the primary language of the country the airline is based in or the language of the city where the plane originates or flies to. This is up to the airline, but most (if not all) elect to do this through a safety briefing or demonstration delivered to all passengers at the same time. A safety demonstration typically covers all these aspects, not necessarily in this order:
 the brace position, which must be adopted on hearing the "Brace, Brace" command during an emergency landing (sometimes called the safety position; this is not required in the United States and certain other countries and is mostly included in European regions)
 the use of the seat belt; most airlines recommend or require that passengers keep their seat belt fastened at all times in case of unexpected turbulence
 the location and use of the emergency exits, evacuation slides and emergency floor level lighting
 a diagram or description of the location of exits on that particular aircraft, or that they are being pointed out by crew and are described in the safety card
a reminder that all passengers should locate (and sometimes count the number of rows to) their nearest exit, which may be behind them
 the requirements for sitting in an emergency exit row (varies by country and airline); in some countries (including the United States) it must also be stated that exit row passengers may be required to assist the crew in an evacuation
 that all passengers must leave all carry-on bags behind during an evacuation
some demonstrations also mention that high heeled shoes and/or any sharp objects must be removed (this is to ensure that evacuation slides are not punctured)
 the use of the oxygen mask (not included on some turboprops which do not fly high enough to need supplemental oxygen in a decompression emergency) with associated reminders:
 that the passenger should always fit his or her own mask on before helping children, the disabled, or any persons requiring assistance
 that even though oxygen will be flowing to the mask, the plastic bag may not inflate (required in the United States after a woman fatally removed her mask thinking it was not working); some planes such as the Boeing 787 or Boeing 777-300ER do not include plastic bags in the oxygen masks.
 if applicable to the aircraft in question, that the passenger must pull down on a strap to retrieve the mask
 this part of the safety demonstration is sometimes technically permitted to be done after take-off, since it is not applicable while the aircraft is at low altitude
 the location and use of the life vests, life rafts and other flotation devices, like floatable seat cushions (not always included if the flight does not overfly or fly near vast masses of water although is required by the FAA on any aircraft equipped with life vests)
restrictions enforced by law and/or airline policies, which typically include
requirements that passengers must comply with lighted signs, posted placards, and crew members instructions (generally only included in safety demonstrations on Australian, New Zealand, and American carriers as the CASA (AU), CAA (NZ) and FAA (US) require it to be stated)
that smoking is not allowed on board, including in the lavatories (though most airlines now refer to them as restrooms); on all domestic flights in the United States and international flights going to or from that country, a warning that prohibits the use of e-cigarettes is also announced
on flights where smoking was permitted, a reminder was often issued that smoking was only acceptable in smoking sections, but not when the no-smoking sign was illuminated nor anywhere else on board; another reminder warned that in case of deployment of the oxygen masks, any lit cigarettes must be extinguished; airlines which prohibited smoking on all their flights usually reminded passengers of such carrier-wide restriction; smoking was banned on all domestic and international flights in 2000
that United States federal law prohibits tampering with, disabling or destroying lavatory smoke detectors
that the use of mobile phones is not allowed during flight, unless placed in "airplane mode" or the wireless capability is turned off, unless the aircraft has cellular connection and/or Wi-Fi
that laptops and other electronics may only be used once the aircraft is at cruising altitude and the captain turns off the fasten seat-belt signs
some airlines may require passengers to also turn off all devices during taxi, take-off, and landing (such as Kenya Airways, Air Transat, and Malaysia Airlines) in addition to having these devices set to airplane mode
if present, most airlines may also require passengers to unplug these devices from charging ports during these times
some newer aircraft have separate “please turn off electronic devices” signs in place of the now unnecessary “no smoking” signs (as smoking is never allowed anyway) and that electronics should be completely shut off and put away when these signs are illuminated
If the passenger loses an electronic device under a seat, the passenger should not attempt to move the seat as this may damage the device or injure the passenger; the passenger should instead notify the flight attendants to locate the device safely
actions required of passengers prior to takeoff (sometimes referred to as “final cabin check” and often accompanied with a physical check by crew):
a reminder that seat belts are securely fastened and that all aisles, bulkheads and emergency exit rows must remain clear at all times
that seatbacks and tray tables should be in their upright and locked position, leg- or footrest put away in premium cabins, and carry-on luggage stowed in the overhead locker or underneath a seat prior to takeoff;
that stowable video screens must be put away
in most cases, if seated next to a window, the window blinds must be raised for take off and landing
this is not necessary to include on aircraft without window shades, typically on low-cost airlines
to review the safety information card prior to takeoff or to follow along during the demonstration/video

History of pre-recorded safety videos 

The approval of using video for pre-flight safety demonstrations was originally included in FAA Advisory Circular 135-12, released on October 9, 1984. This is further explained in FAA Advisory Circular 121-24C, which stated that video offered several advantages over the standard manual demonstration, but only provided that the airliner has the required video and sound systems to exhibit the video properly.

1980s and early 1990s 
As in-flight video entertainment systems were beginning to see mainstream introduction, airlines began producing safety demonstration videos to be used in lieu of or in tandem with a manual demonstration performed by one or more flight attendants. Notable examples include Trans World Airlines, Pan Am, and Northwest.

Early videos from the late 1980s sometimes omit warnings about electronic devices, as it was less of a concern at the time. Since smoking was still acceptable on many airliners, these videos feature antiquated reminders about smoking on board, including acceptable locations to do so and a command to stop smoking should the oxygen masks be deployed.

Videos of this era often use 2-dimensional animation or very primitive 3D computer generated imagery to illustrate elements of the demonstration. While animation is usually used sparingly, some videos are fully animated (usually in 3D), such as ATA's circa-1994 safety video.

When videos of this time were captioned, it was usually only captioned in the language already being spoken on the audio track. Bilingual videos typically had the primary language's instructions repeated verbally immediately afterward, but almost never had the secondary language captioned.

Arguably, elements of the demonstration were either overexplained, underexplained, or poorly described during this time. For instance, TWA's safety video mentioned a "slight burning odor" when oxygen masks are in use. Most demonstrations were also lacking in their explanation of electronic device policies as portable electronic devices were only beginning to become a concern.

Videos were typically designated to a specific model of aircraft but shared certain assets between videos produced by the same airline, including film recorded on a completely different aircraft. This practice continues to the modern day, although it is variably less prevalent than during the 1980s and 1990s.

Late 1990s and early 2000s 

By this point, airlines had found a refined format for their safety videos. Most videos, though produced differently, kept the same basic script with the same points. For instance, the Delta Air Lines safety video from 2000 and 2001 quoted one of their early '90s videos almost verbatim for most of the runtime.

Electronic device policies were also updated to include that cellular phones and other radio-based electronics are not permitted to be used at any time while other devices may be used in-flight but must be shut off for take-off and landing.

Effectiveness 
Research conducted at the University of New South Wales in Australia questions the effectiveness of these briefings in conveying key safety messages for passengers to recall and act upon in an emergency. In one study, a range of pre-recorded safety briefings were tested. One safety briefing contained humor, another was void of humor (said to reflect a standard style briefing), and another used a celebrity to sell the importance of the safety briefing and the messages contained within. Not long after being exposed to the briefing, individuals recalled approximately 50% of the key safety messages from the briefing featuring the celebrity, 45% from the briefing containing humor, and 32% from the briefing void of both a celebrity and humor. Two hours post exposure to the pre-flight safety briefings, recall decreased on average by 4% from the original levels across all conditions.

References

External links

List of airline safety videos

 on the official Air France channel (French and English)
  on the official Air Mauritius channel (English with French subtitles)
 Air New Zealand
  on the official Air New Zealand channel
  on the official Air New Zealand channel
  on the official Air New Zealand Nothing to Hide campaign channel
  on the official All Nippon Airways channel (Japanese and English)
  on the official American Airlines channel
  on the official British Airways channel
  on the official Cathay Pacific channel (English and Cantonese)
  on the official Copa Airlines channel (Spanish and English)
  on the official Delta Air Lines channel
  on the official El Al channel
  on the official Garuda Indonesia channel (English with Indonesian subtitles)
  on the official Hainan Airlines channel (Mandarin Chinese with English subtitles)
  on the official Hawaiian Airlines channel (English with Hawaiian subtitles)
  on the official KLM channel
  on the official LATAM Brasil channel (Portuguese and English)
  on the official Malaysia Airlines channel (English with Malay subtitles)
  on the official Philippine Airlines channel
  on the official Qatar Airways channel (English with Arabic subtitles)
  on the official Singapore Airlines channel
  on the official SriLankan Airlines channel
 Turkish Airlines
  on the official Turkish Airlines channel
  on the official Turkish Airlines channel
  on the official Ukraine International Airlines channel (Ukrainian and English with Russian and Chinese subtitles)
  on the official United Airlines channel
  on the official WestJet channel (English and French)

Other
 The Evolution of Airline Safety Videos from CityLab
 Pixel Labs page about TAM safety video

Aviation safety
Safety practices